The West Castleton Formation is a geologic formation in New York and Vermont. It preserves fossils dating back to the Cambrian period.

It is described in Vermont as "Gray silicious to black, graphitic, pyritiferous slate and phyllite, locally with interbedded thin dark grey dolostone and grey quartzite and arkosic layers.  Thin, white sandy laminae commonly found in the graphitic beds."

Type Section
The type section is a roadcut along Scotch Hill Road, south of West Castleton, Vermont.

See also

 List of fossiliferous stratigraphic units in New York

References

 

Cambrian geology of New York (state)
Cambrian southern paleotemperate deposits